Beth Dobbin (born 7 June 1994 in Doncaster) is a Scottish sprinter who competes mainly in the 200 metres. She is the Scottish record holder for the 200 metres with a time of 22.50 secs. She represented Great Britain at the Tokyo Olympics in 2021.

Career
Dobbin's season best for the 200 metres in 2016 was 23.94 secs at Loughbrough in June. In 2017, she improved her best to 23.31 secs in her heat at the British Championships in July, going on to finish sixth in the final in 23.42.

Dobbin broke the Scottish 200m record four times in June/July 2018. Sandra Whittaker's previous record of 22.98 secs had stood since 1984. Dobbin ran 22.84 at Eton on 2 June, 22.83 at the Diamond League in Stockholm on 10 June, then improved the record twice more at the British Championships in Birmingham on 1 July, running 22.75 in her heat, before winning the final in 22.59. Her other best times include 11.64 secs for the 100 metres (2018) and 53.21 secs for the 400 metres (2018 indoors).

On 15 July 2018, Dobbin finished third in the 200 metres at the Athletics World Cup in London in 22.95 secs. She competed a month later at the European Championships in Berlin, and finished second in her 200 metres semi-final in 22.84 secs on 10 August, to automatically qualify for the following days final, where she finished seventh in a time of 22.93 secs.

On 20 July 2019, Dobbin finished third in the 200 metres at the Müller Anniversary Games in London in a new personal best of 22.50 secs, improving her own Scottish Record by 0.09 secs.

Dobbin was selected to run in the women's 200 metres at the 2020 Summer Olympics. She qualified from her heat but was eliminated in the semi-final in a time of 22.78 secs.  

Dobbin was part of the British 4 x 100 metres quartet than ran a world leading time and set a new meeting record at the British Grand Prix of 42.29 seconds in May 2022.

Personal life
She is the daughter of former Grimsby Town, Barnsley and Doncaster Rovers footballer Jim Dobbin.

International competitions

Domestic medal record

References

External links
 
 
 
 
 
 
 

1994 births
Living people
Scottish female sprinters
British female sprinters
World Athletics Championships athletes for Great Britain
British Athletics Championships winners
Olympic athletes of Great Britain
Athletes (track and field) at the 2020 Summer Olympics
Commonwealth Games bronze medallists for Scotland
Commonwealth Games medallists in athletics
Athletes (track and field) at the 2022 Commonwealth Games
Sportspeople from Doncaster
Athletes from Yorkshire
Anglo-Scots
Medallists at the 2022 Commonwealth Games